Alena Vladimirovna Kartashova (born January 23, 1982) is a wrestler from Russia. She won a silver medal in the women's freestyle 63 kg at the 2008 Summer Olympics.

References
 

1982 births
Living people
People from Angarsk
Russian female sport wrestlers
Olympic wrestlers of Russia
Wrestlers at the 2004 Summer Olympics
Wrestlers at the 2008 Summer Olympics
Olympic silver medalists for Russia
Olympic medalists in wrestling
Medalists at the 2008 Summer Olympics
Sportspeople from Irkutsk Oblast
20th-century Russian women
21st-century Russian women